ICWA may refer to:

 The Indian Child Welfare Act
 Institute of Cost and Works Accountants of India, renamed as the Institute of Cost Accountants Of India (ICAI)
 Chartered Institute of Management Accountants, the renamed Institute of Cost and Works Accountants in the UK
 The Indian Council of World Affairs
 The Insurance Commission of Western Australia, the sole compulsory insurer for motor vehicle personal injuries in Western Australia
 The Institute of Current World Affairs
 , a European wrestling federation, based in Laventie in the [auts-de-France, France